The first season of Sense8, an American science fiction drama streaming television series created by Lana and Lilly Wachowski and J. Michael Straczynski, follows eight strangers from different parts of the world who suddenly discover that they are "sensates"; human beings who are mentally and emotionally linked. The season was produced for Netflix by the Wachowskis' Anarchos Productions and Straczynski's Studio JMS, along with Javelin Productions and Georgeville Television. Unpronounceable Productions was set up to oversee production for the show.

A multinational ensemble cast starring Aml Ameen, Doona Bae, Jamie Clayton, Tina Desai, Tuppence Middleton, Max Riemelt, Miguel Ángel Silvestre, and Brian J. Smith portrays the suddenly connected strangers. Freema Agyeman, Terrence Mann, Anupam Kher, Naveen Andrews, and Daryl Hannah also star. The season acts as the origin story for the eight sensates. All episodes were written by the Wachowskis and Straczynski and the majority of them were directed by the Wachowskis, with the remainder being divided between their frequent collaborators James McTeigue, Tom Tykwer, and Dan Glass. Filming took place almost entirely on location in nine cities around the world: Berlin, Chicago, London, Mexico City, Mumbai, Nairobi, Reykjavík, San Francisco, and Seoul.

All 12 episodes of the season became available for streaming on Netflix on June 5, 2015 and were met with generally favorable critical reception. The season was noted for its representation of LGBTQ characters and themes, winning the GLAAD Media Award for Outstanding Drama Series. It was also recognized with a Location Managers Guild award for its use of locations as an integral part of the story, and a Primetime Emmy Award nomination for Outstanding Original Main Title Theme Music.

Cast

Main

The August 8th cluster 
 Aml Ameen as Capheus "Van Damme" Onyango, a matatu driver in Nairobi who is trying to earn money to buy HIV/AIDS medication for his mother. Capheus' matatu is called the "Van Damn" and sports drawings of Jean-Claude Van Damme as he is a passionate fan of his movies. This, along with his bravery to protect his matatu and its passengers from bandits, earned him his widely used Van Damn nickname (sometimes also called Van Damme). Gabriel Ouma portrays a young Capheus.
 Doona Bae as Sun Bak, daughter of a powerful Seoul businessman and a burgeoning star in the underground kickboxing world. Jane Lee portrays a young Sun.
 Jamie Clayton as Nomi Marks, a trans woman hacktivist and blogger living in San Francisco with her girlfriend Amanita. Nomi chose her name to stand for "Know Me". John Babbo portrays a young Nomi (then called Michael).
 Tina Desai as Kala Dandekar, a university-educated pharmacist and devout Hindu in Mumbai who is engaged to marry a man she does not love. Yashvi Puneet Nagar portrays a young Kala.
 Tuppence Middleton as Riley "Blue" Gunnarsdóttir, an Icelandic DJ living in London who is trying to escape a tragic past. Katrin Sara Olafsdottir portrays a young Riley Gunnarsdóttir.
 Max Riemelt as Wolfgang Bogdanow, a Berlin locksmith and safe-cracker who has unresolved issues with his late father and participates in organized crime. Lenius Jung portrays a young Wolfgang.
 Miguel Ángel Silvestre as Lito Rodriguez, a closeted actor of Spanish background living in Mexico City with his boyfriend Hernando.
 Brian J. Smith as Will Gorski, a Chicago police officer haunted by an unsolved murder from his childhood. Speaking about the Wachowskis picking names that carry a significance for their characters, Smith said about "Will": "The whole idea of Will Gorski, the idea of someone who's got this drive to act and to do, not just to be done to. It's very central to Will's character." Maxwell Jenkins portrays a young Will.

Other regulars
 Freema Agyeman as Amanita "Neets" Caplan, Nomi's girlfriend, who later becomes an ally for the new sensates.
 Terrence Mann as "Whispers", a sensate who turned against his own kind and who is a high-ranking member of an organization determined to neutralize sensates, known as the Biological Preservation Organization (BPO).
 Anupam Kher as Sanyam Dandekar, Kala's loving father, a chef and restaurant owner.
 Naveen Andrews as Jonas Maliki, a sensate from a different cluster who wants to help the newly-born cluster of sensates.
 Daryl Hannah as Angelica "Angel" Turing, a sensate from the same cluster as Jonas, who becomes the "mother" of the new sensates' cluster as she activates their psychic connection.

Recurring
The recurring actors are listed by the region in which they first appear.

 In Nairobi, Kenya
 Paul Ogola as Jela
 Peter King Mwania as Silas Kabaka
 Lwanda Jawar as Githu
 Chichi Seii as Shiro
 Rosa Katanu as Amondi Kabaka
 In Seoul, South Korea
 Ki-chan Lee as Joong-Ki Bak
 Kyong Young Lee as Kang-Dae Bak
 Hye Hwa Kim as Mi-Cha
 Yuh-Jung Youn as Min-Jung
 Sara Sohn as Soo-Jin
 In Pyo Cha as Sun's attorney
 In San Francisco, California, United States of America
 Adam Shapiro as Dr. Metzger
 Michael Sommers as Bug
 Sandra Fish as Janet Marks
 Maximilienne Ewalt as Grace
In Mumbai, Maharashtra, India
 Purab Kohli as Rajan Rasal
 Natasha Rastogi as Priya Dandekar
 Darshan Jariwala as Manendra Rasal
 Mita Vasisht as Sahana Rasal
 Chandarmohan Khanna as Guru Yash
 Huzane Mewawala as Daya Dandekar
 Avantika Akerkar as Aunty Ina
 Shruti Bapna as Devi
 In London, England, United Kingdom
 Frank Dillane as Shugs
 Nicôle Lecky as Bambie
 Joseph Mawle as Nyx
 In Reykjavík, Iceland
 Kristján Kristjánsson as Gunnar
 Lilja Þórisdóttir as Yrsa
 Eyþór Gunnarsson as Sven
 Thor Birgisson as Magnus Þórsson
In Berlin, Germany
 Max Mauff as Felix Bernner
 Sylvester Groth as Sergei Bogdanow
 Christian Oliver as Steiner Bogdanow
 Bernhard Schütz as Anton Bogdanow
 Georg Tryphon as Abraham
 In Mexico City, Mexico
 Alfonso Herrera as Hernando Fuentes
 Eréndira Ibarra as Daniela Velazquez
 Raúl Méndez as Joaquin Flores
 Ari Brickman as the director in Lito's movies
 Alberto Wolf as bartender
 In Chicago, Illinois, United States of America
 Ness Bautista as Diego Morales
 William Burke as Deshawn
 Larry Clarke as a Police Captain
 Margot Thorne as Sara Patrell
 Joe Pantoliano as Michael Gorski

Episodes

Production

Filming and locations 
To properly tell the international aspects of the story, filming for Sense8 took place almost entirely on location around the globe. In the first season they filmed in nine cities located in eight countries: Berlin, Chicago, London, Mexico City, Mumbai, Nairobi, Reykjavík, San Francisco, and Seoul. Production on the first season began on June 18, 2014 in San Francisco. The filmmakers successfully negotiated with the organizers of the Clarion Alley Mural Project and select artists to feature their artwork in the show. Shooting in Chicago began on July 9 and wrapped up on August 8, with filming taking place both on location and at the Cinespace Film Studios. They shot some scenes in the Superdawg drive-through restaurant, while customers were being asked not to stare at the filming. Lana and Lilly Wachowski are frequent customers of the place. During location scouting, the producers found the City Methodist Church in Gary, Indiana which is nearby Chicago, and changed one site's description in the scripts to a church accordingly in order to fit that particular site into the filming. They filmed in the church from July 25 to 28. Filming proceeded to London for a short shoot and then to Iceland, where between August 26 and September 6 they shot in Reykjavik and nearby places such as Akranes. Filming then started in Nairobi, where a sequence required a crowd of 700 extras, 200 cars and a helicopter. In Seoul they filmed from September 18 to 30. Next they moved to Mexico City and later to Germany, where they filmed in Berlin and inside Babelsberg Studio. Last place they visited was Mumbai where they also shot a Bollywood dance number that was choreographed by Slumdog Millionaires Longinus Fernandes. The writers wanted to feature an event in each city. They were able to schedule the Pride scenes with its Dykes on Bikes on the Dyke March in San Francisco, the Fourth of July fireworks celebration in Chicago, and the Ganesha Chaturthi Hindu festival in Mumbai. Additionally they recorded footage from the Fresh Meat Festival of transgender and queer performance in San Francisco, a club event taking place at the KOKO in London, and a real lucha libre (Mexican professional wrestling) event with the fighters wearing wrestling masks in Arena Naucalpan, in Mexico City. Lastly the scenes where characters are flying on an airplane were recorded during the real flights the cast and crew had to do to get from London to Iceland. On November 17, 2014 Straczynski wrote that the main unit shooting had wrapped, with only a few winter shots in Iceland remaining to be captured the next month. These scenes were further delayed to mid-January 2015, until Iceland had the necessary amount of snow, with the wrap party taking place in Reykjavík's Harpa Music and Concert hall on January 21. By the end of the shooting, the filmmakers had completed 100,000 miles of flight time, or four times around the globe.

Music 
Johnny Klimek and Tom Tykwer, who co-composed the score for Cloud Atlas and had a minor contribution in the soundtrack of The Matrix Revolutions as part of Pale 3, composed the season's music which was orchestrated by their fellow Cloud Atlas collaborator Gene Pritsker. The music was written before filming began and it was recorded by the MDR Leipzig Radio Symphony Orchestra. Ethan Stoller and Gabriel Isaac Mounsey, past collaborators of the Wachowskis and Tykwer, are credited for composing additional music and score. Stoller also acted as the season's music editor.

The theme music was picked by the Wachowskis from the two hours of original music Tykwer and Klimek had written. It was shortened from its original seven or eight minutes and a choir and electronic elements were added to it at the wish of the Wachowskis. The show received a nomination for Outstanding Original Main Title Theme Music during the 68th Primetime Creative Arts Emmy Awards.

The title of Episode 4, "What's Going On?", refers to lyrics in the song "What's Up?" by the 4 Non Blondes, which is featured in a scene where the main cast collectively sings it as their first shared experience together. After Nomi escaped from the hospital she said the lyrics were in her head all day and Amanita recognized the song saying it was the perfect soundtrack for a lobotomy.

A soundtrack album for the first season was released digitally by WaterTower Music on May 5, 2017. It includes 10 tracks by Klimek and Tykwer, and four licensed songs including "What's Up?". Klimek and Tykwer's compositions alone, are also available on WaterTower's YouTube channel.

Reception

Critical reception and popularity 
Critical reception of the first season of Sense8 has been generally favorable. Rotten Tomatoes, a review aggregator website, reported a 71% critical approval rating with an average rating of 6.25/10 based on 62 reviews. The website's critical consensus reads, "Some of the scenarios border on illogical, but the diverse characters and the creative intersections between their stories keep the Wachowskis' Sense8 compelling." On Metacritic, which uses a weighted average, the season is assigned a score of 64 out of 100, based on 24 critics, indicating "generally favorable reviews".

In a report released by Netflix it was discovered that at least 70% of the viewers that watched up to the third episode ended up watching the entire first season, and Straczynski was told there are people that watch it "straight through – three, four, six times." In another report released by Netflix, Sense8 was listed among the shows whose viewers tend to heavily binge-watch their first seasons, rather than savoring their episodes by watching them at a slower pace. Netflix's Chief Content Officer Ted Sarandos praised the success of Sense8 in the up-and-coming French and German markets but also globally. Vice president of international series for Netflix Erik Barmack has named Sense8 one of the most popular Netflix series in the Brazilian market. Less than three days after the premiere of the first season, Variety reported that it had been pirated more than half a million times, regardless of the series' digital distribution.

Accolades

Marketing 
The red carpet premiere of Sense8's first season took place on May 27, 2015, in San Francisco's AMC Metreon, where the first three episodes were previewed. Starting in the middle of July 2015, Netflix Brazil released a series of documentary shorts called Sense8: Decoded. Inspired by Sense8 and directed by João Wainer, the shorts briefly touch upon subjects such as psychiatry, feminism, being transgender and buddhism. Later in the month, Netflix released a music track titled Brainwave Symphony on Spotify. To produce it they subjected eight strangers to a series of various stimuli and they recorded their individual brainwaves using EEG sensors. After extracting a melody from each of them they arranged them in a way to produce a track which mirrors the escalating action of the season. In early August 2015, Netflix made available Sense8: Creating the World, a half-hour web television documentary, shot around the world, about the making of the first season of the series.

References

External links 
 
 

2015 American television seasons